Viktor Torshin (21 March 1948 – 20 August 1993) was a Russian sport shooter who competed in the 1972 Summer Olympics and in the 1976 Summer Olympics. He won a bronze medal at the 1972 Summer Olympics.

References

1948 births
1993 deaths
Russian male sport shooters
ISSF pistol shooters
Olympic shooters of the Soviet Union
Shooters at the 1972 Summer Olympics
Shooters at the 1976 Summer Olympics
Olympic bronze medalists for the Soviet Union
Olympic medalists in shooting
Medalists at the 1972 Summer Olympics